Śladków may refer to the following places in Poland:

Śladków Duży
Śladków Górny
Śladków Mały
Śladków Podleśny
Śladków Rozlazły